Our Lady of the Wayside Church is a modest church built in 1912 for the then-growing Catholic parish of Portola Valley by a combined effort of Jewish, Protestant and Catholic members of The Family, a San Francisco men's club that owns a nearby rural retreat.

The building itself was constructed of steel-reinforced concrete with stucco finish in the Mission Revival style, with the added Georgian element of the main doorway with its scrolled pediment. Mission Revival features include the tiled gable roof with exposed rafter ends, round-arched windows and buttressed side walls.

James Rupert Miller, an architect and a member of The Family, gave the assignment of designing the church to a rising young draftsman at his firm: Timothy L. Pflueger. The building was 19-year-old Pflueger's first commission. Pflueger drew on his familiarity with Mission San Francisco de Asís in his native San Francisco for inspiration.

In 1977, a plaque was placed proclaiming the building as California Registered Historical Landmark number 909. The church was also added to the National Register of Historic Places in 1977.

The historic church suffered extensive damage in the 1989 Loma Prieta earthquake, and was recommended for demolition by structural experts. Instead, it was repaired by its congregation at a cost of US$600,000.

References

External links
Library of Congress. Historic American Buildings Survey. Gallery of monochrome images taken in 1975
Photograph of the plaque proclaiming California Registered Historical Landmark No. 909

Churches on the National Register of Historic Places in California
History of San Mateo County, California
Churches in San Mateo County, California
Roman Catholic churches completed in 1912
20th-century Roman Catholic church buildings in the United States
Mission Revival architecture in California
California Historical Landmarks
Roman Catholic churches in California
National Register of Historic Places in San Mateo County, California
1912 establishments in California
Portola Valley, California